Ainsley Thomas Battles (born November 6, 1978) is a former American football player. He attended Parkview High School in Lilburn, Georgia. After finishing high school, he went on to play football for Vanderbilt University. After finishing school at Vanderbilt, he went on to be a professional American football player, safety in the National Football League. He played four seasons for the Pittsburgh Steelers and the Jacksonville Jaguars. During a heated 2003 training camp battle for starting strong safety with the Buffalo Bills, Ainsley Battles left the team for an undisclosed reason. After his time as a football player was over, he went on to be a Social Studies teacher at Archer High School and at Central Gwinnett High School, both in Lawrenceville, Georgia. Later he taught English II at Atlantic Coast High School in Jacksonville, Florida, where he also served as a defensive backs football coach. Most recently, he resides in Las Vegas, Nevada.

References

1978 births
Living people
People from Lilburn, Georgia
Sportspeople from the Atlanta metropolitan area
Players of American football from Georgia (U.S. state)
American football safeties
Vanderbilt Commodores football players
Pittsburgh Steelers players
Jacksonville Jaguars players